Altor (Latin: Altor or gens Altorus) is an old masculine given name. The name means "caretaker" or "caregiver".

References

Masculine given names